Bob Timberlake may refer to:

 Bob Timberlake (American football) (born 1943), American football player
 Bob Timberlake (artist) (born 1937), North Carolina painter, artist and designer of clothing and furniture